Mark William Hagood (born June 2, 1956) was an American politician who served one term as a Republican member of the Virginia House of Delegates. He was elected in 1987, defeating long-term incumbent Frank Slayton, but lost reelection two years later.

Hagood is the grand-nephew of James D. Hagood, who long served as a member of the state senate.

References

External links 
 

1956 births
Living people
Republican Party members of the Virginia House of Delegates
20th-century American politicians